Buusaar is a town in the southwestern Gedo region of Somalia.

References
Buusaar

Populated places in Gedo